Khankala is a settlement in Groznensky District of the Chechen Republic, Russia, located to the east of Grozny, the republic's capital. Population: 

The settlement is the location of a Russian military base, the former headquarters of the 42nd Motor Rifle Division (now the headquarters of the successor unit 18th Guards Motor Rifle Brigade), and an airstrip.  It was the site of the Battle of Khankala in 1994.

See also
2002 Khankala Mi-26 crash

References

Rural localities in Groznensky District
Military installations of Russia